Bryan Mahoney may refer to:

Big B (rapper), Bryan Mahoney, American rapper
Bryan Mahoney, candidate in Wild Rose (electoral district)

See also
Brian Mahoney (disambiguation)